This is a list of United States senators from Kentucky. The state's senators belong to Classes 2 and 3. Kentucky is currently represented in the U.S. Senate by Republicans Mitch McConnell (serving since 1985) and Rand Paul (serving since 2011). Currently, on his seventh term in office, McConnell has been the Senate Republican Leader since 2007, and is Kentucky's longest-serving senator.

List of senators

|- style="height:2em"
| colspan=3 | Vacant
| nowrap | Jun 1, 1792 –Jun 18, 1792
| Kentucky elected its senators a couple of weeks after statehood.
| rowspan=2 | 1
| rowspan=2 
| rowspan=3 | 1
| Kentucky elected its senators a couple of weeks after statehood.
| nowrap | Jun 1, 1792 –Jun 18, 1792
| colspan=3 | Vacant

|- style="height:2em"
! rowspan=7 | 1
| rowspan=7 align=left | John Brown
| rowspan=2  | Anti-Admin.
| rowspan=7 nowrap | Jun 18, 1792 –Mar 3, 1805
| Elected in 1792.
| rowspan=2 | Elected in 1792.
| rowspan=2 nowrap | Jun 18, 1792 –Mar 3, 1795
| rowspan=2  | Anti-Admin.
| rowspan=2 align=right | John Edwards
! rowspan=2 | 1

|- style="height:2em"
| rowspan=3 | Re-elected in 1792.
| rowspan=3 | 2
| 

|- style="height:2em"
| rowspan=5  | Democratic-Republican
| 
| rowspan=3 | 2
| rowspan=3 | Elected in 1794.Lost re-election.
| rowspan=3 nowrap | Mar 4, 1795 –Mar 3, 1801
| rowspan=3  | Federalist
| rowspan=3 align=right | Humphrey Marshall
! rowspan=3 | 2

|- style="height:2em"
| 

|- style="height:2em"
| rowspan=3 | Re-elected in 1798.Lost re-election.
| rowspan=3 | 3
| 

|- style="height:2em"
| 
| rowspan=6 | 3
| rowspan=3 | Elected in 1800.Resigned to become U.S. Attorney General.
| rowspan=3 nowrap | Mar 4, 1801 –Aug 7, 1805
| rowspan=3  | Democratic-Republican
| rowspan=3 align=right | John Breckinridge
! rowspan=3 | 3

|- style="height:2em"
| 

|- style="height:2em"
! rowspan=6 | 2
| rowspan=6 align=left | Buckner Thruston
| rowspan=6  | Democratic-Republican
| rowspan=6 nowrap | Mar 4, 1805 –Dec 18, 1809
| rowspan=6 | Elected in 1804.Resigned to become judge of the U.S. Circuit Court.
| rowspan=8 | 4
| rowspan=4 

|- style="height:2em"
|  
| nowrap | Aug 7, 1805 –Nov 8, 1805
| colspan=3 | Vacant

|- style="height:2em"
| Elected to finish Breckinridge's term.Lost re-election and resigned because of participation in the Burr conspiracy.
| nowrap | Nov 8, 1805 –Nov 18, 1806
|  | Democratic-Republican
| align=right | John Adair
! 4

|- style="height:2em"
| Elected to finish Adair's term, despite not meeting the constitutional age minimum.Retired.
| nowrap | Nov 19, 1806 –Mar 3, 1807
|  | Democratic-Republican
| align=right | Henry Clay
! 5

|- style="height:2em"
| 
| rowspan=5 | 4
| rowspan=5 | Elected in 1806.Retired.
| rowspan=5 nowrap | Mar 4, 1807 –Mar 3, 1813
| rowspan=5  | Democratic-Republican
| rowspan=5 align=right | John Pope
! rowspan=5 | 6

|- style="height:2em"
| rowspan=3 

|- style="height:2em"
| colspan=3 | Vacant
| nowrap | Dec 18, 1809 –Jan 10, 1810
|  

|- style="height:2em"
! 3
| align=left | Henry Clay
|  | Democratic-Republican
| nowrap | Jan 10, 1810 –Mar 3, 1811
| Appointed to finish Thruston's term.Retired.

|- style="height:2em"
! rowspan=2 | 4
| rowspan=2 align=left | George Bibb
| rowspan=2  | Democratic-Republican
| rowspan=2 nowrap | Mar 4, 1811 –Aug 23, 1814
| rowspan=2 | Elected in 1811.Resigned to return to private practice.
| rowspan=10 | 5
| 

|- style="height:2em"
| rowspan=6 
| rowspan=10 | 5
| rowspan=4 | Elected in 1813.Resigned.
| rowspan=4 nowrap | Mar 4, 1813 –Dec 24, 1814
| rowspan=4  | Democratic-Republican
| rowspan=4 align=right | Jesse Bledsoe
! rowspan=4 | 7

|- style="height:2em"
| colspan=3 | Vacant
| nowrap | Aug 23, 1814 –Aug 30, 1814
|  

|- style="height:2em"
! 5
| align=left | George Walker
|  | Democratic-Republican
| nowrap | Aug 30, 1814 –Feb 2, 1815
| Appointed to continue Bibb's term.Successor qualified.

|- style="height:2em"
! rowspan=4 | 6
| rowspan=4 align=left | William Barry
| rowspan=4  | Democratic-Republican
| rowspan=4 nowrap | Feb 2, 1815 –May 1, 1816
| rowspan=4 | Elected to finish Bibb's term.Resigned to become judge of the Kentucky Circuit Court.

|- style="height:2em"
|  
| nowrap | Dec 24, 1814 –Feb 2, 1815
| colspan=3 | Vacant

|- style="height:2em"
| rowspan=5 | Elected in 1815 to finish Bledsoe's term.Retired or lost re-election.
| rowspan=5 nowrap | Feb 2, 1815 –Mar 3, 1819
| rowspan=5  | Democratic-Republican
| rowspan=5 align=right | Isham Talbot
! rowspan=5 | 8

|- style="height:2em"
| rowspan=3 

|- style="height:2em"
| colspan=3 | Vacant
| nowrap | May 1, 1816 –Nov 3, 1816
|  

|- style="height:2em"
! 7
| align=left | Martin Hardin
|  | Democratic-Republican
| nowrap | Nov 3, 1816 –Mar 3, 1817
| Appointed to continue Barry's term.Elected in 1816 to finish Barry's termRetired.

|- style="height:2em"
! 8
| align=left | John J. Crittenden
|  | Democratic-Republican
| nowrap | Mar 4, 1817 –Mar 3, 1819
| Elected in 1816.Resigned to return to private practice.
| rowspan=6 | 6
| 

|- style="height:2em"
| colspan=3 | Vacant
| nowrap | Mar 3, 1819 –Dec 10, 1819
|  
| rowspan=4 
| rowspan=6 | 6
| rowspan=2 | Elected in 1818.Resigned to run for governor.
| rowspan=2 nowrap | Mar 4, 1819 –May 28, 1820
| rowspan=2  | Democratic-Republican
| rowspan=2 align=right | William Logan
! rowspan=2 | 9

|- style="height:2em"
! rowspan=7 | 9
| rowspan=7 align=left | Richard Mentor Johnson
| rowspan=5  | Democratic-Republican
| rowspan=7 nowrap | Dec 10, 1819 –Mar 3, 1829
| rowspan=4 | Elected to finish Logan's term.

|- style="height:2em"
|  
| nowrap | May 28, 1820 –Oct 19, 1820
| colspan=3 | Vacant

|- style="height:2em"
| rowspan=3 | Elected to finish Logan's term.Retired or lost re-election.
| rowspan=3 nowrap | Oct 19, 1820–Mar 3, 1825
| rowspan=3  | Democratic-Republican
| rowspan=3 align=right | Isham Talbot
! rowspan=3 | 10

|- style="height:2em"
| 

|- style="height:2em"
| rowspan=3 | Re-elected in 1823.Lost re-election.
| rowspan=3 | 7
| 

|- style="height:2em"
| rowspan=2  | Jacksonian
| 
| rowspan=3 | 7
| rowspan=3 | Election year unknown.Retired or lost re-election.
| rowspan=3 nowrap | Mar 4, 1825 –Mar 3, 1831
| rowspan=3  | Jacksonian
| rowspan=3 align=right | John Rowan
! rowspan=3 | 11

|- style="height:2em"
| 

|- style="height:2em"
! rowspan=4 | 10
| rowspan=4 align=left | George Bibb
| rowspan=4  | Jacksonian
| rowspan=4 nowrap | Mar 4, 1829 –Mar 3, 1835
| rowspan=4 | Elected in 1829.Retired or lost re-election.
| rowspan=4 | 8
| 

|- style="height:2em"
| rowspan=2 
| rowspan=4 | 8
|  
| nowrap | Mar 4, 1831 –Nov 10, 1831
| colspan=3 | Vacant

|- style="height:2em"
| rowspan=3 | Elected late in 1831.
| rowspan=6 nowrap | Nov 10, 1831 –Mar 31, 1842
| rowspan=3  | NationalRepublican
| rowspan=6 align=right | Henry Clay
! rowspan=6 | 12

|- style="height:2em"
| 

|- style="height:2em"
! rowspan=3 | 11
| rowspan=3 align=left | John J. Crittenden
|  | NationalRepublican
| rowspan=3 nowrap | Mar 4, 1835 –Mar 3, 1841
| rowspan=3 | Elected in 1835.Retired.
| rowspan=3 | 9
| 

|- style="height:2em"
| rowspan=2  | Whig
| 
| rowspan=4 | 9
| rowspan=3 | Re-elected in 1836.Resigned.
| rowspan=3  | Whig

|- style="height:2em"
| 

|- style="height:2em"
! rowspan=4 | 12
| rowspan=4 align=left | James T. Morehead
| rowspan=4  | Whig
| rowspan=4 nowrap | Mar 4, 1841 –Mar 3, 1847
| rowspan=4 | Elected in 1841.Retired or lost re-election.
| rowspan=4 | 10
| rowspan=2 

|- style="height:2em"
| Elected to finish Clay's term.
| rowspan=4 nowrap | Mar 31, 1842 –Jun 12, 1848
| rowspan=4  | Whig
| rowspan=4 align=right | John J. Crittenden
! rowspan=4 | 13

|- style="height:2em"
| 
| rowspan=5 | 10
| rowspan=3 | Re-elected in 1843.Resigned to become Governor of Kentucky.

|- style="height:2em"
| 

|- style="height:2em"
! rowspan=8 | 13
| rowspan=8 align=left | Joseph R. Underwood
| rowspan=8  | Whig
| rowspan=8 nowrap | Mar 4, 1847 –Mar 3, 1853
| rowspan=8 | Election year unknown.Retired.
| rowspan=8 | 11
| rowspan=3 

|- style="height:2em"
|  
| nowrap | Jun 12, 1848 –Jun 23, 1848
| colspan=3 | Vacant

|- style="height:2em"
| Appointed to continue Crittenden's term.Elected in 1849 to finish Crittenden's term.Retired or lost re-election.
| nowrap | Jun 23, 1848 –Mar 3, 1849
|  | Whig
| align=right | Thomas Metcalfe
! 14

|- style="height:2em"
| 
| rowspan=6 | 11
| rowspan=2 | Elected in 1849.Resigned effective Sep 6, 1852, but died Jun 24, 1852.
| rowspan=2 nowrap |Mar 4, 1849 –Jun 24, 1852
| rowspan=2  | Whig
| rowspan=2 align=right | Henry Clay
! rowspan=2 | 15

|- style="height:2em"
| rowspan=4 

|- style="height:2em"
|  
| nowrap | Jun 24, 1852 –Jul 6, 1852
| colspan=3 | Vacant

|- style="height:2em"
| Appointed to continue Clay's term.Lost election to finish Clay's term.
| nowrap | Jul 6, 1852 –Aug 31, 1852
|  | Democratic
| align=right | David Meriwether
! 16

|- style="height:2em"
| rowspan=2 | Elected in 1851 to finish Clay's term, in anticipation of Clay's resignation.Retired.
| rowspan=2 nowrap | Sep 1, 1852 –Mar 3, 1855
| rowspan=2  | Whig
| rowspan=2 align=right | Archibald Dixon
! rowspan=2 | 17

|- style="height:2em"
! rowspan=3 | 14
| rowspan=3 align=left | John B. Thompson
| rowspan=3  | Know Nothing
| rowspan=3 nowrap | Mar 4, 1853 –Mar 3, 1859
| rowspan=3 | Elected in 1851, far in advance of the term.Retired or lost re-election.
| rowspan=3 | 12
| 

|- style="height:2em"
| 
| rowspan=3 | 12
| rowspan=3 | Elected in 1854.Retired.
| rowspan=3 nowrap | Mar 4, 1855–Mar 3, 1861
|  | Whig
| rowspan=3 align=right | John J. Crittenden
! rowspan=3 | 18

|- style="height:2em"
| 
| rowspan=2  | Know Nothing

|- style="height:2em"
! rowspan=5 | 15
| rowspan=5 align=left | Lazarus W. Powell
| rowspan=5  | Democratic
| rowspan=5 nowrap | Mar 4, 1859 –Mar 3, 1865
| rowspan=5 | Elected in 1858.Retired to run for U.S. President.
| rowspan=5 | 13
| 

|- style="height:2em"
| rowspan=3 
| rowspan=5 | 13
| Elected in 1859, far in advance of the term.Expelled for supporting the Confederacy.
| nowrap | Mar 4, 1861 –Dec 4, 1861
|  | Democratic
| align=right | John C. Breckinridge
! 19

|- style="height:2em"
|  
| nowrap | Dec 4, 1861 –Dec 10, 1861
| colspan=3 | Vacant

|- style="height:2em"
| rowspan=3 | Elected to finish Breckinridge's term.
| rowspan=8 nowrap | Dec 10, 1861 –Sep 22, 1872
| rowspan=3  | Unionist
| rowspan=8 align=right | Garrett Davis
! rowspan=8 | 20

|- style="height:2em"
| 

|- style="height:2em"
! rowspan=2 | 16
| rowspan=2 align=left | James Guthrie
| rowspan=2  | Democratic
| rowspan=2 nowrap | Mar 4, 1865 –Feb 7, 1868
| rowspan=2 | Elected in 1865.Resigned due to ill health.
| rowspan=5 | 14
| 

|- style="height:2em"
| rowspan=3 
| rowspan=7 | 14
| rowspan=5 | Re-elected in 1867.Died.
| rowspan=5  | Democratic

|- style="height:2em"
| colspan=3 | Vacant
| nowrap | Feb 7, 1868 –Feb 19, 1868
|  

|- style="height:2em"
! rowspan=2 | 17
| rowspan=2 align=left | Thomas C. McCreery
| rowspan=2  | Democratic
| rowspan=2 nowrap | Feb 19, 1868 –Mar 3, 1871
| rowspan=2 | Elected to finish Guthrie's term.Lost re-election.

|- style="height:2em"
| 

|- style="height:2em"
! rowspan=5 | 18
| rowspan=5 align=left | John W. Stevenson
| rowspan=5  | Democratic
| rowspan=5 nowrap | Mar 4, 1871 –Mar 3, 1877
| rowspan=5 | Elected in 1871.Retired.
| rowspan=5 | 15
| rowspan=3 

|- style="height:2em"
|  
| nowrap | Sep 22, 1872 –Sep 27, 1872
| colspan=3 | Vacant

|- style="height:2em"
| Appointed to continue Davis's term.Elected in 1873 to finish Davis's term.Retired or lost re-election.
| nowrap | Sep 27, 1872 –Mar 3, 1873
|  | Democratic
| align=right | Willis Machen
! 21

|- style="height:2em"
| 
| rowspan=3 | 15
| rowspan=3 | Elected in 1872.Retired.
| rowspan=3 nowrap | Mar 4, 1873 –Mar 3, 1879
| rowspan=3  | Democratic
| rowspan=3 align=right | Thomas C. McCreery
! rowspan=3 | 22

|- style="height:2em"
| 

|- style="height:2em"
! rowspan=7 | 19
| rowspan=7 align=left | James B. Beck
| rowspan=7  | Democratic
| rowspan=7 nowrap | Mar 4, 1877 –May 3, 1890
| rowspan=3 | Elected in 1876.
| rowspan=3 | 16
| 

|- style="height:2em"
| 
| rowspan=3 | 16
| rowspan=3 | Elected in 1879.Lost re-election.
| rowspan=3 nowrap | Mar 4, 1879 –Mar 3, 1885
| rowspan=3  | Democratic
| rowspan=3 align=right | John Stuart Williams
! rowspan=3 | 23

|- style="height:2em"
| 

|- style="height:2em"
| rowspan=3 | Re-elected in 1882.
| rowspan=3 | 17
| 

|- style="height:2em"
| 
| rowspan=5 | 17
| rowspan=5 | Elected in 1884.
| rowspan=10 nowrap | Mar 4, 1885 –Mar 3, 1897
| rowspan=10  | Democratic
| rowspan=10 align=right | J. C. S. Blackburn
! rowspan=10 | 24

|- style="height:2em"
| 

|- style="height:2em"
| Re-elected in 1888.Died.
| rowspan=7 | 18
| rowspan=3 

|- style="height:2em"
| colspan=3 | Vacant
| nowrap | May 3, 1890 –May 26, 1890
|  

|- style="height:2em"
! rowspan=2 | 20
| rowspan=2 align=left | John Carlisle
| rowspan=2  | Democratic
| rowspan=2 nowrap | May 26, 1890 –Feb 4, 1893
| rowspan=2 | Elected to finish Beck's term.Resigned.

|- style="height:2em"
| rowspan=3 
| rowspan=5 | 18
| rowspan=5 | Re-elected in 1890.Lost re-election.

|- style="height:2em"
| colspan=3 | Vacant
| nowrap | Feb 4, 1893 –Feb 15, 1893
|  

|- style="height:2em"
! rowspan=5 | 21
| rowspan=5 align=left | William Lindsay
| rowspan=5  | Democratic
| rowspan=5 nowrap | Feb 15, 1893 –Mar 3, 1901
| rowspan=2 | Elected to finish Carlisle's term.

|- style="height:2em"
| 

|- style="height:2em"
| rowspan=3 | Re-elected in 1894.Retired.
| rowspan=3 | 19
| 

|- style="height:2em"
| 
| rowspan=3 | 19
| rowspan=3 | Elected in 1897.Retired.
| rowspan=3 nowrap | Mar 4, 1897 –Mar 3, 1903
| rowspan=3  | Republican
| rowspan=3 align=right | William J. Deboe
! rowspan=3 | 25

|- style="height:2em"
| 

|- style="height:2em"
! rowspan=3 | 22
| rowspan=3 align=left | Joseph Blackburn
| rowspan=3  | Democratic
| rowspan=3 nowrap | Mar 4, 1901 –Mar 3, 1907
| rowspan=3 | Elected in 1900.Lost re-election.
| rowspan=3 | 20
| 

|- style="height:2em"
| 
| rowspan=3 | 20
| rowspan=3 | Elected in 1902.Lost renomination.
| rowspan=3 nowrap | Mar 4, 1903 –Mar 3, 1909
| rowspan=3  | Democratic
| rowspan=3 align=right | James B. McCreary
! rowspan=3 | 26

|- style="height:2em"
| 

|- style="height:2em"
! rowspan=3 | 23
| rowspan=3 align=left | Thomas H. Paynter
| rowspan=3  | Democratic
| rowspan=3 nowrap | Mar 4, 1907 –Mar 3, 1913
| rowspan=3 | Elected in 1906.Retired.
| rowspan=3 | 21
| 

|- style="height:2em"
| 
| rowspan=5 | 21
| rowspan=3 | Elected in 1908.Died.
| rowspan=3 nowrap | Mar 4, 1909 –May 23, 1914
| rowspan=3  | Republican
| rowspan=3 align=right | William O. Bradley
! rowspan=3 | 27

|- style="height:2em"
| 

|- style="height:2em"
! rowspan=5 | 24
| rowspan=5 align=left | Ollie Murray James
| rowspan=5  | Democratic
| rowspan=5 nowrap | Mar 4, 1913 –Aug 28, 1918
| rowspan=5 | Elected in 1912.Died.
| rowspan=7 | 22
| rowspan=3 

|- style="height:2em"
|  
| nowrap | May 23, 1914 –Jun 16, 1914
| colspan=3 | Vacant

|- style="height:2em"
| Appointed to continue Bradley's term.Elected in 1914 to finish Bradley's term.Retired.
| nowrap | Jun 16, 1914 –Mar 3, 1915
|  | Democratic
| align=right | Johnson N. Camden Jr.
! 28

|- style="height:2em"
| 
| rowspan=5 | 22
| rowspan=5 | Elected in 1914.Lost re-election.
| rowspan=5 nowrap | Mar 4, 1915 –Mar 3, 1921
| rowspan=5  | Democratic
| rowspan=5 align=right | J. C. W. Beckham
! rowspan=5 | 29

|- style="height:2em"
| rowspan=3 

|- style="height:2em"
| colspan=3 | Vacant
| nowrap | Aug 28, 1918 –Sep 7, 1918
|  

|- style="height:2em"
! 25
| align=left | George B. Martin
|  | Democratic
| nowrap | Sep 7, 1918 –Mar 3, 1919
| Appointed to finish James's term.Retired.

|- style="height:2em"
! rowspan=3 | 26
| rowspan=3 align=left | Augustus Stanley
| rowspan=3  | Democratic
| rowspan=3 nowrap | Mar 4, 1919 –Mar 3, 1925
| rowspan=3 | Elected in 1918.Didn't take seat until May 19, 1919 in order to remain Governor of Kentucky.Lost re-election.
| rowspan=3 | 23
| 

|- style="height:2em"
| 
| rowspan=3 | 23
| rowspan=3 | Elected in 1920.Lost re-election.
| rowspan=3 nowrap | Mar 4, 1921 –Mar 3, 1927
| rowspan=3  | Republican
| rowspan=3 align=right | Richard P. Ernst
! rowspan=3 | 30

|- style="height:2em"
| 

|- style="height:2em"
! rowspan=3 | 27
| rowspan=3 align=left | Fred Sackett
| rowspan=3  | Republican
| rowspan=3 nowrap | Mar 4, 1925 –Jan 9, 1930
| rowspan=3 | Elected in 1924.Resigned to become U.S. Ambassador to Germany.
| rowspan=6 | 24
| 

|- style="height:2em"
| 
| rowspan=6 | 24
| rowspan=6 | Elected in 1926.
| rowspan=20 nowrap | Mar 4, 1927 –Jan 19, 1949
| rowspan=20  | Democratic
| rowspan=20 align=right | Alben W. Barkley
! rowspan=20 | 31

|- style="height:2em"
| rowspan=4 

|- style="height:2em"
| colspan=3 | Vacant
| nowrap | Jan 9, 1930 –Jan 11, 1930
|  

|- style="height:2em"
! 28
| align=left | John Robsion
|  | Republican
| nowrap | Jan 11, 1930 –Nov 30, 1930
| Appointed to continue Sackett's term.Lost elections to finish Sackett's term and to next term.

|- style="height:2em"
! 29
| align=left | Ben M. Williamson
|  | Democratic
| nowrap | Dec 1, 1930 –Mar 3, 1931
| Elected in 1930 to finish Sackett's term.Retired.

|- style="height:2em"
! rowspan=5 | 30
| rowspan=5 align=left | M. M. Logan
| rowspan=5  | Democratic
| rowspan=5 nowrap | Mar 4, 1931 –Oct 3, 1939
| rowspan=3 | Elected in 1930.
| rowspan=3 | 25
| 

|- style="height:2em"
| 
| rowspan=3 | 25
| rowspan=3 | Re-elected in 1932.

|- style="height:2em"
| 

|- style="height:2em"
| rowspan=2 | Re-elected in 1936.Died.
| rowspan=5 | 26
| 

|- style="height:2em"
| rowspan=3 
| rowspan=5 | 26
| rowspan=5 | Re-elected in 1938.

|- style="height:2em"
| colspan=3 | Vacant
| nowrap | Oct 3, 1939 –Oct 10, 1939
|  

|- style="height:2em"
! rowspan=4 | 31
| rowspan=4 align=left | Happy Chandler
| rowspan=4  | Democratic
| rowspan=4 nowrap | Oct 10, 1939 –Nov 1, 1945
| rowspan=2 | Appointed to continue Logan's term.Elected in 1940 to finish Logan's term.

|- style="height:2em"
| 

|- style="height:2em"
| rowspan=2 | Re-elected in 1942.Resigned to become Commissioner of Baseball.
| rowspan=6 | 27
| 

|- style="height:2em"
| rowspan=4 
| rowspan=8 | 27
| rowspan=6 | Re-elected in 1944.Resigned to become U.S. Vice President.

|- style="height:2em"
| colspan=3 | Vacant
| nowrap | Nov 1, 1945 –Nov 19, 1945
|  

|- style="height:2em"
! 32
| align=left | William A. Stanfill
|  | Republican
| nowrap | Nov 19, 1945 –Nov 5, 1946
| Appointed to continue Chandler's term.Retired.

|- style="height:2em"
! rowspan=2 | 33
| rowspan=2 align=left | John Sherman Cooper
| rowspan=2  | Republican
| rowspan=2 nowrap | Nov 6, 1946 –Jan 3, 1949
| rowspan=2 | Elected to finish Chandler's term.Lost re-election.

|- style="height:2em"
| rowspan=1 

|- style="height:2em"
! rowspan=4 | 34
| rowspan=4 align=left | Virgil Chapman
| rowspan=4  | Democratic
| rowspan=4 nowrap | Jan 3, 1949 –Mar 8, 1951
| rowspan=4 | Elected in 1948.Died.
| rowspan=8 | 28
| rowspan=3 

|- style="height:2em"
| rowspan=1 | Appointed to continue Barkley's term.Resigned to trigger special election.
| rowspan=1 nowrap | Jan 20, 1949 –Nov 26, 1950
| rowspan=1  | Democratic
| rowspan=1 align=right | Garrett Withers
! rowspan=1 | 32

|- style="height:2em"
| Elected to finish Barkley's term, having been elected to the next term.
| rowspan=10 nowrap | Nov 27, 1950 –Jan 3, 1957
| rowspan=10  | Democratic
| rowspan=10 align=right | Earle Clements
! rowspan=10 | 33

|- style="height:2em"
| rowspan=4 
| rowspan=9 | 28
| rowspan=9 | Elected to full term in 1950.Lost re-election.

|- style="height:2em"
| colspan=3 | Vacant
| nowrap | Mar 8, 1951 –Mar 19, 1951
|  

|- style="height:2em"
! 35
| align=left | Thomas R. Underwood
|  | Democratic
| nowrap | Mar 19, 1951 –Nov 4, 1952
| Appointed to continue Chapman's term.Lost election to finish Chapman's term.

|- style="height:2em"
! rowspan=2 | 36
| rowspan=2 align=left | John Sherman Cooper
| rowspan=2  | Republican
| rowspan=2 nowrap | Nov 5, 1952 –Jan 3, 1955
| rowspan=2 | Elected to finish Chapman's term. Lost re-election.

|- style="height:2em"
| 

|- style="height:2em"
! 37
| align=left | Alben W. Barkley
|  | Democratic
| nowrap | Jan 3, 1955 –Apr 30, 1956
| Elected in 1954.Died.
| rowspan=6 | 29
| rowspan=4 

|- style="height:2em"
| colspan=3 | Vacant
| nowrap | Apr 30, 1956 –Jun 21, 1956
|  

|- style="height:2em"
! 38
| align=left | Robert Humphreys
|  | Democratic
| nowrap | Jun 21, 1956 –Nov 6, 1956
| Appointed to continue Barkley's term.Retired when elected successor qualified.

|- style="height:2em"
! rowspan=10 | 39
| rowspan=10 align=left | John Sherman Cooper
| rowspan=10  | Republican
| rowspan=10 nowrap | Nov 7, 1956 –Jan 3, 1973
| rowspan=3 | Elected to finish Barkley's term.

|- style="height:2em"
| 
| rowspan=3 | 29
| rowspan=3 | Elected in 1956.
| rowspan=6 nowrap | Jan 3, 1957 –Dec 16, 1968
| rowspan=6  | Republican
| rowspan=6 align=right | Thruston Morton
! rowspan=6 | 34

|- style="height:2em"
| 

|- style="height:2em"
| rowspan=3 | Re-elected in 1960.
| rowspan=3 | 30
| 

|- style="height:2em"
| 
| rowspan=4 | 30
| rowspan=3 | Re-elected in 1962.Retired, and resigned early to give successor preferential seniority.

|- style="height:2em"
| 

|- style="height:2em"
| rowspan=4 | Re-elected in 1966.Retired.
| rowspan=4 | 31
| rowspan=2 

|- style="height:2em"
| Appointed to finish Morton's term, having already been elected to the next term.
| rowspan=4 nowrap | Dec 17, 1968 –Dec 27, 1974
| rowspan=4  | Republican
| rowspan=4 align=right | Marlow Cook
! rowspan=4 | 35

|- style="height:2em"
| 
| rowspan=4 | 31
| rowspan=3 | Elected in 1968.Lost re-election, and resigned early to give successor preferential seniority.

|- style="height:2em"
| 

|- style="height:2em"
! rowspan=7 | 40
| rowspan=7 align=left | Walter Dee Huddleston
| rowspan=7  | Democratic
| rowspan=7 nowrap | Jan 3, 1973 –Jan 3, 1985
| rowspan=4 | Elected in 1972.
| rowspan=4 | 32
| rowspan=2 

|- style="height:2em"
| Appointed to finish Cook's term, having already been elected to the next term.
| rowspan=13 nowrap | Dec 28, 1974 –Jan 3, 1999
| rowspan=13  | Democratic
| rowspan=13 align=right | Wendell Ford
! rowspan=13 | 36

|- style="height:2em"
| 
| rowspan=3 | 32
| rowspan=3 | Elected in 1974.

|- style="height:2em"
| 

|- style="height:2em"
| rowspan=3 | Re-elected in 1978.Lost re-election.
| rowspan=3 | 33
| 

|- style="height:2em"
| 
| rowspan=3 | 33
| rowspan=3 | Re-elected in 1980.

|- style="height:2em"
| 

|- style="height:2em"
! rowspan=21 | 41
| rowspan=21 align=left | Mitch McConnell
| rowspan=21  | Republican
| rowspan=21 nowrap | Jan 3, 1985 –Present
| rowspan=3 | Elected in 1984.
| rowspan=3 | 34
| 

|- style="height:2em"
| 
| rowspan=3 | 34
| rowspan=3 | Re-elected in 1986.

|- style="height:2em"
| 

|- style="height:2em"
| rowspan=3 | Re-elected in 1990.
| rowspan=3 | 35
| 

|- style="height:2em"
| 
| rowspan=3 | 35
| rowspan=3 | Re-elected in 1992.Retired.

|- style="height:2em"
| 

|- style="height:2em"
| rowspan=3 | Re-elected in 1996.
| rowspan=3 | 36
| 

|- style="height:2em"
| 
| rowspan=3 | 36
| rowspan=3 | Elected in 1998.
| rowspan=6 nowrap | Jan 3, 1999 –Jan 3, 2011
| rowspan=6  | Republican
| rowspan=6 align=right | Jim Bunning
! rowspan=6 | 37

|- style="height:2em"
| 

|- style="height:2em"
| rowspan=3 | Re-elected in 2002.
| rowspan=3 | 37
| 

|- style="height:2em"
| 
| rowspan=3 | 37
| rowspan=3 | Re-elected in 2004.Retired.

|- style="height:2em"
| 

|- style="height:2em"
| rowspan=3 | Re-elected in 2008.
| rowspan=3 | 38
| 

|- style="height:2em"
| 
| rowspan=3 | 38
| rowspan=3 | Elected in 2010.
| rowspan=9 nowrap | Jan 3, 2011 –Present
| rowspan=9  | Republican
| rowspan=9 align=right | Rand Paul
! rowspan=9 | 38

|- style="height:2em"
| 

|- style="height:2em"
| rowspan=3 | Re-elected in 2014.
| rowspan=3 | 39
| 

|- style="height:2em"
| 
| rowspan=3 | 39
| rowspan=3 | Re-elected in 2016.

|- style="height:2em"
| 

|- style="height:2em"
| rowspan=3 |Re-elected in 2020.
| rowspan=3 | 40
| 

|- style="height:2em"
| 
| rowspan=3|40
| rowspan=3| Re-elected in 2022.

|- style="height:2em"
| 

|- style="height:2em"
| rowspan=2 colspan=5 | To be determined in the 2026 election.
| rowspan=2| 41
| 

|- style="height:2em"
| 
| 41
| colspan=5 | To be determined in the 2028 election.

See also

 List of United States representatives from Kentucky
 United States congressional delegations from Kentucky
 Elections in Kentucky

Notes

References 
 
 

 
United States Senators
Kentucky